Polysiphonia furcellata (C.Agardh) Harvey is small marine red alga in the Division Rhodophyta.

Description
This red alga is a branched algae growing to 
10 cm. The erect branches are ecorticate composed of a central axis of cells surrounded by 7 or 8 paraxial cells, all of the same length in a ring around the axial cells. The rhizoids are numerous growing from the pericentral cells. Gametangial and tetrasporangial plants are not known. Reproduction  is by specialized propagules

Distribution
England, Wales, Ireland, Isle of Man and Scotland.Canary Islands and in the Mediterranean.

References

Rhodomelaceae
Taxa named by Carl Adolph Agardh